Sapotskin is a small town in Belarus,  north-west of Hrodna with circa 2,000 inhabitants. Sapotskin became one of the centers of the Polish minority in Belarus. It is the only town in Belarus where the Polish population, consisting of the majority, is allowed to use bilingual street signs.

History

Within the Grand Duchy of Lithuania, Sapotskin was part of Trakai Voivodeship. In 1795, Sapotskin was acquired by the Kingdom of Prussia as a result of the Third Partition of Poland and incorporated into the New East Prussia Province.

From 1807 until 1815, Sapotskin was part of Łomża Department of the Duchy of Warsaw.

In 1815, Sapotskin was acquired by the Russian Empire. Within the Russian Empire, the town was successively part of Augustów Voivodeship (1815-1837), Augustów Governorate (1837-1867) and Suwałki Governorate (1867-1915) before German occupation between 1915 and 1918.

From 1921 until 1939, Sapotskin was part of the Second Polish Republic. It was a gmina centre in the Augustów powiat of Białystok Voivodeship.

In September 1939, Sapotskin was occupied by the Red Army and, on 14 November 1939, incorporated into the Byelorussian SSR. The area became part of the Belastok Region of the Byelorussian SSR, with Sapotskin as a regional centre.

On 22 June 1941, the Germans invaded the Soviet Union and set fire to Sapotskin.  The Jewish population at that time was around 1300, and the Germans ordered them to dig mass graves and bury the hundreds of dead from the shelling and fire, both Jewish and non-Jewish. The Germans then asked local Poles to identify Jewish collaborators with the Soviet occupation.  The Poles gave them a long list, some of whom had nothing to do with the Soviet regime, including the local rabbi and other community leaders, and those Jews were executed.  After that, surviving Jews were confined to a seriously overcrowded and unsanitary ghetto.  Those conditions, plus the lack of clean water, led to an outbreak of cholera. In 1942, many Jewish men were sent to labor camps, older and sick Jews were sent to an unknown place and executed, and in November, those remaining were taken to the Kielbasin transit camp. From there, about a month later, they were sent to the Grodno ghetto and then, in January 1943, to Auschwitz where almost all were murdered.  Only a few Sapotskin  Jews survived the Holocaust, including those protected by the Falejczyk and Bykowski families who were later named by Yad Vashem as Righteous Among the Nations.

A memorial book about the town's Jewish shtetl was translated into English.

During the German occupation, Sapotskin was administered as a part of Bezirk Bialystok. Sapotskin was liberated by the Red Army on 18 July 1944. The town became a regional centre of Grodno Region.

Old photographs of the town have been collected.

Notables
  Sapotskin is the death place of Gen. Józef Olszyna-Wilczyński and his adjutant, murdered by Soviet soldiers
 Jaroslav Romanchuk, a Belarusian economist and 2010 presidential candidate, was born in Sapotskin

Attractions
 Burial mound (10-11 cent.) - archaeological monument, on the western outskirts 
 Church of the Assumption of the Blessed Virgin Mary (early 20th Century)
 Sapotskinsky Biological Reserve  (Augustów Canal)

References

External links
 Old pictures of Sopockinie

Urban-type settlements in Belarus
Populated places in Grodno Region
Trakai Voivodeship
Suwałki Governorate
Białystok Voivodeship (1919–1939)
Belastok Region
Shtetls
Holocaust locations in Belarus
Grodno District